Nureyev, Nureev, Nuriyev, or Nuriev is a Russianized Muslim masculine family name meaning "light". Its feminine counterpart is Nureyeva, Nureeva, Nuriyeva, or Nurieva. It may refer to:
Aydar Nuriev (born 1994), Russian racing driver
Elkhan Nuriyev (born 1969), Azerbaijani political scientist
Ilgiz Nuriyev (1984), Russian ice hockey  player
Marat Nuriyev (born 1966), Russian politician
 Rudolf Nureyev (1938–1993), Russian dancer of Tatar and Bashkir origin
 Fonteyn & Nureyev on Broadway
 Nureyev (1977–2001), a Kentucky-bred Thoroughbred racehorse and champion sire
 Nureyev (crater), a crater on Mercury

Tatar-language surnames